Alexander Sergeyevich Lazarev (Алекса́ндр Серге́евич Ла́зарев; 3 January 1938 – 2 May 2011) was a Soviet and Russian theater and film actor, the People's Artist of Russia and the USSR State Prize laureate (both 1977). A Moscow Mayakovsky Theater veteran (where throughout his fifty years career he played more than fifty parts) Lazarev appeared in more than 100 films, including One More Thing About Love (1968) which made him famous.

Biography 
Alexander Lazarev was born in Leningrad, to the artist and designer Sergey Nikolayevich Lazarev (1899–1984) and Olympiada Kuzminichna Lazareva (née Tarasova, (1907–1996). The family survived the first month of the Siege, then managed to get out of the city and make it to Orenburg. In 1944 they returned home and the next year Alexander went to school. By the time of graduation he's made a decision to become an actor, citing later Robert Taylor's performance in Waterloo Bridge as the major influence. In 1955 Lazarev joined the Young actors' studio at the Moscow Art Theater. After a short stint at the Nikolay Akimov-led Saint Petersburg Comedy Theatre, he moved to Mayakovsky Theater, led at the time by Nikolay Okhlopkov where the part of Boytsov the electrician in Aleksei Arbuzov's The Irkutsk Story was his first success.

In 1961 Lazarev debuted in film, in thriller melodrama Free Wind (Вольный ветер, 1961), based on Isaak Dunayevsky's operetta of the same name. Among his other notable theatre roles of the 1960s were the sailor anarchist Gushcha in Between the Rainfalls (Okhlopkov's last production there), uber-lieutenant Schering in The Defector (1964) and Varavvin in Pyotr Fomenko-directed The Death of Tarelkin (1966). The leading part of physicist Yevdokimov in Georgy Natanson's 1968 film One More Thing About Love (Ещё раз про любовь, co-starring Tatyana Doronina) brought Lazarev nationwide acclaim.

The director Andrey Goncharov's arrival as Mayakovsky Theater marked the second phase of Alexander Lazarev's successful career there. First his performance as Don Quixote in A Man of La Mancha was lauded by critics, then the leading part in Venceremos!, after Genrikh Borovik's play, earned him the USSR State Prize. Among Lazarev's other important stage works of the period were General Khludov (in Flight, 1978, based on Mikhail Bulgakov's play), Rittmeister in The Life of Klim Samgin (1981, after an unfinished Maxim Gorky's novel, premiered as a TV play in 1986), and Vladimir Mayakovsky in Mark Rozovsky's The Beginnings (1983). In A Crayfish Laughs (1986, a play about the life of Sarah Bernhardt, the latter played by his wife Svetlana Nemolyaeva), Lazarev managed at last to realize his comedy actor potential to the full. Then followed Circle (1988, after W. Somerset Maugham's 1921 play), A Patron's Joke (1992, after Arkady Averchenko) and Victim of Our Age (1994, the adaptation of Alexandr Ostrovsky's The Last Victim), the latter earning Lazarev the Moscow Prize for Literature and Arts. He received another prestigious award, Chrystal Turandot, for the leading part of Edmund Kean in Kean the Fourth, Tatyana Akhramkova's production of Grigory Gorin's play.

Lazarev continued to appear in films throughout the 2000s but none of those were particularly successful. "In theater he was continuously demonstrating his brilliance, his versatility, his comedy actor's potential. In cinema? Silence. Not one of our famous film directors has ever invited him to play a more or less substantial part. 'What we have we neglect, once we lose it – mourn it'," author and critic Edward Radzinsky, speaking on the Russian TV (and quoting the Russian proverb) commented in 2011.

Alexander Lazarev died in Abramtsevo, Moscow Oblast, on 2 May 2011. He is interred in Troyekurovskoye Cemetery in Moscow.

Family
On 27 March 1960 Alexander Lazarev married a fellow Mayakovsky Theater actress Svetlana Nemolyaeva. They lived happily with for 51 years, until his death. Their son Aleksander Lazarev Jr. (born 27 April 1967) is a Lencom actor, the People's Artist of Russia (2007) and the State Prize (1996) laureate.

Alexander Lazarev's younger brother Yuri (born 22 July 1944), a Saint Petersburg Comedy Theatre actor, has been honoured with the Meritorious Artist (1994) and the People's Artist of Russia (2009) titles.

Selected filmography 
 1961 — Free Wind   as  Yango  (leading role)
 1964 — Taking Fire Upon Ourselves    as Fyodor, partisan unit commander 
 1966 — On a Wild Shore  as Sakko 
 1967 — In the Beautiful Furious World  (TV play)
 1967 — Revenge (Возмездие) as German doctor 
 1968 — Portrait of Dorian Gray  as   Basil 
 1968 — One Thing More About Love  as  Yevdokimov, physicist  (leading role)
 1968 — Knight of Dream as clairvoyant musician
 1969 — Late Flowers  as  doctor Toporkov  (leading role)
 1971 — Deadly Enemy  as  Yaschurov 
 1971 — Talents and Followers (TV play)  as Meluzov 
 1971 — Blackened Crumpets (USSR-GDR)
 1971 — What to Do?  (TV play, author)
 1972 — In Answer for Everything  as Mashkov, physicist 
 1972 — 17th Transatlantic  as captain Lukhmanov 
 1973 — Dmitry Kantemir   as Peter the Great 
 1973 — An Hour Before Dawn  as Derzhavin 
 1974 — Movie Star as Igor Grekov, film director 
 1974 — Time of Her Sons (   as Gulyaev, a physicist 
 1975 — Led By a Bright Light  as actor 
 1975 — A Boy With an Épée  as   Artemyev, school director 
 1975 — Such a Short Life as Kalugin 
 1975 — Black Sea Waves  as general Zarya-Zaryanitsky 
 1976 — Your Own Opinion  as Konstantinov, partkom secretary 
 1977 — Risk is a Virtue  as Listov, actor 
 1977 — The Long Ordeal  as   Zhadov 
 1978 — Velvet Season  as Lamer 
 1978 — Where were you, Odysseus?  as oberfuhrer Warburg 
 1978 — Gamblers   (TV play) as Krugel 
 1979 —  Licrative Contract  as Tregubov, KGB general 
 1979 — Month of Long Days as Aleksandr Nikolayevich 
 1980 — Evening Lbirynth  as Main Attractions boss 
 1980 — Through Thorns to the Stars as professor Klimov 
 1981 — The Nightly Fairytale  as Peter Munk 
 1981 — Uncle's Dream (TV play) as governor general
 1981 — The Hunter (TV play)  as Zubarin 
 1982 — Take Care of Men! as Grafov, a sculptor 
 1982 — Inspector Losev as Zurikh 
 1983 — Demidovs  as  Peter the Great 
 1983 —  Crazy Day of Engineer Barkasov  as  Doctor 
 1985 — The Strange Story of Dr. Jekyll and Mr. Hyde  as   Lanyon 
 1985 — Children of the Sun as  Vagin, artist 
 1986 — Through Main Street with an Orchestra  as  Romanovsky 
 1986 — The Mysterious Prisoner  as Alexander II of Russia
 1986 — Secret Ambassador  as Peter the Great
 1986 — The Life of Klim Samgin  as Roman Georgievich, Rittmeister 
 1987 — Its Not Always Summer in Crimea  as Nikolay Semashko 
 1988 — The Adventures of Quentin Durward  as  Louis XI of France 
 1989 — Differed of Characters as Gorohov   (leading role)
 1989 — The Stepanchikovo Village and Its Inhabitants  as Colonel Egor Rostanev 
 1990 — The War Was Tomorrow (TV play) as Lyberetsky 
 2002 — Kean the Fourth (TV play)  as Edmund Kean (leading role)

Literature 
 Дубровский В. Серебряный шнур: А. Лазарев, С. Немоляева, А. Лазарев-младший. М., 2001.

References

External links 
 

1938 births
2011 deaths
Male actors from Saint Petersburg
Soviet male film actors
Academicians of the Russian Academy of Cinema Arts and Sciences "Nika"
Moscow Art Theatre School alumni
Burials in Troyekurovskoye Cemetery